Hassi Ben Abdellah is a town and commune in Sidi Khouiled District, Ouargla Province, Algeria, located near the provincial capital, Ouargla. According to the 2008 census it has a population of 4,950, up from 3,693 in 1998, and an annual growth rate of 3.0%.

Geography

The land in the area alternates between sand dunes and flat rocky plains dotted with small areas of fertile oases. There is a large palm plantation to the west of Hassi Ben Abdellah that is irrigated with oasis water.

Economy

Most local people are employed in agriculture, including farming of date palms, olives and pomegranates, and the raising of camels and other livestock. Fish farming is also an emerging industry in the region.

Transportation

There are two local roads out of Hassi Ben Abdellah. One connects the town to Sidi Khouiled and Ouargla to the southwest; the other connects to the N56 national highway to the south. From Ouargla, the N49 connects to Ghardaia in the west and Hassi Messaoud in the east. The N56 highway connects to Biskra via the N3.

Localities
The commune is composed of two localities:
Hassi Benabdellah
Sahn

References

Neighbouring towns and cities

Communes of Ouargla Province
Ouargla Province